Anquell McCollum (born 1973) is an American college basketball assistant coach for Fayetteville State University. McCollum previously coached college and high school basketball, and as a professional player he competed in numerous countries during a four-year career between 1996 and 2000. His collegiate career at Western Carolina University was also successful, as he was named the Southern Conference Player of the Year in 1996.

Early life
A native of Fayetteville, North Carolina, McCollum attended his hometown's E. E. Smith High School. In a game played on March 5, 1992, he set a then-state record with 24 three-point field goal attempts, which was later broken in 2004. Of the 24 attempts, McCollum made 11, which was also a state record at the time.

College and professional careers
McCollum played for the Western Carolina Catamounts between 1992–93 and 1995–96. As a freshman he secured a Southern Conference (SoCon) All-Freshmen Team selection. Between his sophomore and senior seasons, McCollum earned three All-SoCon tournament selections, was a two-time First Team All-SoCon player, and in 1995–96 he was named both the conference player of the year as well as the conference tournament's MVP. That season, McCollum averaged 25 points per game (ranked fifth nationally) and led the Catamounts to one of the most historic seasons in school history. Western Carolina began the 1995–96 season with a 3–10 overall record, but rattled off 11 wins in their final 13 games to clinch the Southern Conference South Division title with a 10–4 conference record; that was the school's first-ever SoCon basketball title. The Catamounts then went on to win all three SoCon Tournament games, including a win over Davidson, who at the time was on a 19-game winning streak. By winning the 1996 SoCon Tournament (of which McCollum was named MVP), Western Carolina clinched its first NCAA tournament berth. In the 1996 NCAA tournament, Western Carolina nearly became the first #16-seed to defeat a #1-seed when they narrowly lost to Purdue 73–71 in the opening round.

Following his collegiate career, McCollum did not get selected in the 1996 NBA Draft. He instead played professionally overseas, spending time in five different countries in four years before returning home to play in the United States Basketball League – his final stop before retiring. McCollum played in France (1996–97), Venezuela (1997–99), Colombia (1998), Hong Kong (1998), and the Dominican Republic (2000) during his tenure.

Coaching career
After returning to the United States in 2000, he returned to Western Carolina University to finish attaining his degree in Computer Information Systems. Between 2000 and 2004, and aside from obtaining his degree, McCollum worked as a middle school computer skills teacher and then as an assistant director of admissions for Western Carolina. In 2004–05 he became an official assistant coach for the men's basketball team at his alma mater, a position he held for 14 seasons. In 2018–19 he spent one season as the head coach for Freedom Christian Academy in Fayetteville, North Carolina. The next year, he accepted an assistant coaching position at Fayetteville State University.

References

External links
Western Carolina coach profile

1973 births
Living people
American expatriate basketball people in Colombia
American expatriate basketball people in the Dominican Republic
American expatriate basketball people in France
American expatriate basketball people in Hong Kong
American expatriate basketball people in Venezuela
American men's basketball players
Basketball coaches from North Carolina
Basketball players from North Carolina
Hermine Nantes Basket players
High school basketball coaches in North Carolina
Fayetteville State Broncos basketball coaches
Schoolteachers from North Carolina
Shooting guards
Sportspeople from Fayetteville, North Carolina
Western Carolina Catamounts men's basketball coaches
Western Carolina Catamounts men's basketball players